David Graham McGee  (born 11 December 1947) served as an Ombudsman in New Zealand from 2007 until 31 May 2013.

Prior to this he was a long serving staff member within the New Zealand Parliament. He commenced employment in Parliament's Office of the Clerk in 1974 and filled several roles, including acting as Clerk of Select Committees. He was appointed Clerk of the House of Representatives in 1985 and was a member of the committee which devised the legislation that became law as the Constitution Act 1986.  He is the author of Parliamentary Practice in New Zealand, which is the authoritative guide to parliamentary procedure in New Zealand.  He has also written extensively in the area of parliamentary and constitutional law. He was admitted as a barrister and solicitor in 1977, appointed as Queen's Counsel in 2000 and received the degree Doctor of Laws from the Victoria University of Wellington in 2009.

Honours and awards
In 1977, McGee was awarded the Queen Elizabeth II Silver Jubilee Medal, and in 1990 he received the New Zealand 1990 Commemoration Medal. In the 2002 Queen's Birthday and Golden Jubilee Honours, McGee was appointed a Companion of the New Zealand Order of Merit, for services to Parliament.

References

1947 births
Living people
Clerks of the New Zealand House of Representatives
New Zealand King's Counsel
Companions of the New Zealand Order of Merit